Rustamnagar Sahaspur is a census town in Moradabad district in the Indian state of Uttar Pradesh.

Demographics
 India census, Rustamnagar Sahaspur had a population of 14,198. Males constitute 53% of the population and females 47%. Rustamnagar Sahaspur has an average literacy rate of 71%, lower than the national average of 59.5%: male literacy is 79%, and female literacy is 62%. In Rustamnagar Sahaspur, 20% of the population is under 6 years of age.

References

Cities and towns in Moradabad district